Norbert Lammert (born 16 November 1948) is a German politician of the Christian Democratic Union (CDU). He served as the 12th President of the Bundestag from 2005 to 2017.

Early life and education
The son of a baker, Lammert attended gymnasium in Bochum where he studied classics. He obtained his abitur in 1967. He carried out military service in the Bundeswehr from 1967 to 1969. Following his military service he went on to the Ruhr University Bochum, which included a period abroad at the University of Oxford, where he studied political science and modern history. He went on and obtained his doctorate (Dr. rer. soc.) from the Ruhr University Bochum in 1975.

Political career
Having joined the CDU in 1966, he was deputy chairman of the Bochum branch of the CDU. From 1978–1984, he was deputy leader of a part (Westfalen-Lippe) of the North Rhine-Westphalian branch of the Junge Union, the CDU youth organization. In the 1980 national elections, he was elected to the Bundestag and had kept his mandate continuously until stepping down in 2017. During his tenure in the Bundestag he served (as usual for all MPs) on several committees.

Following the 2005 federal elections in which the CDU became the strongest party and formed a grand coalition with the Social Democratic Party (SPD), Lammert was elected by the Bundestag on 18 October 2005 to replace Wolfgang Thierse of the SPD as its President. Lammert received 564 of 607 votes cast, including most of the SPD's votes. He was reelected to this post by the 17th Bundestag after the 2009 federal election with a similarly good result. In his capacity as president, he chairs the parliament’s Council of Elders, which – among other duties – determines daily legislative agenda items and assigning committee chairpersons based on party representation. Lammert's tenure in office gained him recognition across party lines as he was determined to uphold the honor and importance of the federal parliament while at the same time displaying a dry, sophisticated sense of humor most notably in exchanges with then-chairmen of Die Linke Gregor Gysi.

In the negotiations to form a Grand Coalition of the Christian Democrats (CDU together with the Bavarian CSU) and the SPD following the 2013 federal elections, Lammert was part of the CDU/CSU delegation in the working group on cultural and media affairs, led by Michael Kretschmer and Klaus Wowereit.

When Federal President Joachim Gauck announced in June 2016 that he would not stand for reelection, Lammert was soon mentioned by German and international media as likely successor.

In October 2016, Lammert announced that he would not stand in the 2017 federal elections and resign from active politics by the end of the parliamentary term.

Later career
In 2018, Lammert took on the role of chairman of the Konrad Adenauer Foundation (KAS).

Since 2022, following an appointment by Chancellor Olaf Scholz, Lammert has been serving on a three-member panel (alongside Krista Sager and Andreas Voßkuhle) to assess potential conflicts of interest, requiring senior German officials from the chancellor to deputy ministers to observe a cooling-off period if they want to quit the government for a job in business.

Political positions

Role of the parliament
Throughout his tenure, Lammert has not shied from speaking out against the government about potential threats to parliament's role. He became widely respected for upholding parliamentarians' rights, including leading the way in condemning the 1915 Armenian massacres as a Turkish genocide in 2016. In 2011, he questioned why the Bundestag had not been consulted on Chancellor Angela Merkel's decision to close all nuclear plants following Fukushima Daiichi nuclear disaster. He has insisted that members of parliament be consulted fully on the bailout schemes for the euro zone debt crisis.

European integration 
In 2012, Lammert said he wants a financial transaction tax to be introduced in as many countries as possible, “at least” in the Eurozone. Later that year, he demanded that the EU not take in new members for the time being because of the European debt crisis and also expressed doubts that Croatia was ready to join; Croatia eventually joined the EU in 2013.

Human rights 
Following the Charlie Hebdo shooting in 2015, Lammert criticized Saudi Arabia for condemning the Paris attacks as a violation of Islam, "then two days later letting the blogger Raif Badawi be flogged in public in Jeddah for insulting Islam". Ahead of Egyptian president Abdel Fattah el-Sisi's first official visit to Germany in June 2015, Lammert announced that he would not meet the former army chief, citing "an unbelievable number of death sentences".

In February 2016, Lammert visited the Zaatari refugee camp in Jordan to learn more about the plight of Syrians fleeing the violence in the ongoing Syrian civil war that erupted in 2011.

In June 2017, Lammert voted against Germany’s introduction of same-sex marriage.

Controversy

Party financing 
In December 2010, Lammert imposed on the CDU a fine of 1.2 million euros ($1.6 million) for breaching party donation rules, for party funding violations in the western state of Rhineland-Palatinate at the time of the regional election in 2006.

Plagiarism allegations 
In July 2013, an anonymous internet blogger, using the name of Robert Schmidt, accused Lammert of having plagiarized other works when writing his dissertation. Lammert rejected this reproach and asked the University of Bochum to check his dissertation; he also published it via internet. High-ranking politicians of the Social Democratic Party (SPD) and of the German Green Party underlined that there should be no condemnation(s) in advance.
In November 2013 the university finished a thorough investigation and came to the conclusion that, although the dissertation contained "avoidable shortcomings in the citations", those did not constitute plagiarism.

Other activities

Corporate boards
 RAG AG, Member of the Supervisory Board
 RAG-Stiftung, Member of the Board of Trustees (2017–2022)
 Evonik Industries, Member of the Supervisory Board (2005-2007)
 RTL Television, Member of the Program Committee (1998-2007)

Non-profit organizations
 Konrad Adenauer Prize, Member of the Advisory Board
 Kunsthistorisches Institut in Florenz (KHI), Member of the Board of Trustees
 Federal Cultural Foundation, ex-officio Member of the Board of Trustees
 Goethe-Institut, Member of the General Meeting
 Institute for Advanced Study, Member of the Board of Trustees (2009-2013)
 Konrad Adenauer Foundation, Chairman of the Board of Directors
 Memorial to the Murdered Jews of Europe, Chairman of the Board of Trustees
 musikFabrik, Member of the Board of Trustees
 Norbert Lammert Foundation, Chairman of the Board of Trustees
 Ruhrfestspiele, Member of the Supervisory Board
 Ruhr University Bochum, Member of the Board of Trustees (2002-2008)

Recognition
 2019 – Hans Ehrenberg Prize

Personal life
Lammert is member of the Catholic Church. He is married to Gertrud and has four children.

Literature

References

External links

Official biography at bundestag.de
 

|-

1948 births
German Roman Catholics
Grand Crosses 1st class of the Order of Merit of the Federal Republic of Germany
Living people
Members of the Bundestag for North Rhine-Westphalia
Members of the Order of Merit of North Rhine-Westphalia
People from Bochum
Presidents of the Bundestag
Alumni of the University of Oxford
Members of the Bundestag 2013–2017
Members of the Bundestag 2009–2013
Members of the Bundestag 2005–2009
Members of the Bundestag 2002–2005
Members of the Bundestag 1998–2002
Members of the Bundestag 1994–1998
Members of the Bundestag 1990–1994
Members of the Bundestag 1987–1990
Members of the Bundestag 1983–1987
Members of the Bundestag 1980–1983
Members of the Bundestag for the Christian Democratic Union of Germany
Parliamentary State Secretaries of Germany